The Long Term Ecological Research Network (LTER) consists of a group of over 1800 scientists and students studying ecological processes over extended temporal and spatial scales. Twenty-eight LTER sites cover a diverse set of ecosystems. It is part of the International Long Term Ecological Research Network (ILTER). The project was established in 1980 and is funded by the National Science Foundation. Data from LTER sites is publicly available in the Environmental Data Initiative repository and findable through DataONE search.

LTER sites

There are 28 sites within the LTER Network across the United States, Puerto Rico, and Antarctica, each conducting research on different ecosystems.
LTER sites are both physical places and communities of researchers. Some of the physical places are remote or protected from development, others are deliberately located in cities or agricultural areas. Either way, the program of research for each LTER is tailored to the most pressing and promising questions for that location and the program of research determines the group of researchers with the skills and interests to pursue those questions.

While each LTER site has a unique situation—with different organizational partners and different scientific challenges—the members of the Network apply several common approaches to understanding long-term ecological phenomena. These include observation, large-scale experiments, modeling, synthesis science and partnerships.
 Andrews Forest LTER (AND)
 Arctic LTER (ARC)
 Baltimore Ecosystem Study LTER (BES)
 Beaufort Lagoon Ecosystem LTER (BLE)
 Bonanza Creek LTER (BNZ)
 Central Arizona - Phoenix LTER (CAP)
 California Current Ecosystem LTER (CCE)
 Cedar Creek LTER (CDR) 
 Coweeta LTER (CWT) - NSF LTER funding from 1980-2020
 Florida Coastal Everglades LTER (FCE)
 Georgia Coastal Ecosystems LTER (GCE)
 Harvard Forest LTER (HFR)
 Hubbard Brook  LTER (HBR)
 Jornada Basin LTER (JRN)
 Kellogg Biological Station LTER (KBS)
 Konza Prairie LTER (KNZ)
 Luquillo LTER (LUQ)
 McMurdo Dry Valleys LTER (MCM)
 Minneapolis-St. Paul LTER (MSP)
 Moorea Coral Reef LTER (MCR)
 Niwot Ridge LTER (NWT)
 North Temperate Lakes LTER (NTL)
 Northeast U.S. Shelf LTER (NES)
 Northern Gulf of Alaska LTER (NGA)
 Palmer LTER (PAL)
 Plum Island Ecosystem LTER (PIE)
 Santa Barbara Coastal LTER (SBC)
 Sevilleta LTER (SEV)
 Shortgrass Steppe LTER (SGS) - funded from 1982-2014 at the Central Plains Experimental Range
Virginia Coast Reserve LTER (VCR)

See also
 National Ecological Observatory Network
 Long-Term Agroecosystem Research Network

References

External links
 ILTER Network 
 LTER Network
 European Long-Term Ecosystem Research Network
 Austrian Long-Term Ecosystem Research Network

Ecology organizations
Ecological data